Altenia is a genus of moths in the family Gelechiidae.

Species
Altenia elsneriella Huemer & Karsholt, 1999
Altenia inscriptella (Christoph, 1882)
Altenia mersinella (Staudinger, 1879)
Altenia modesta (Danilevsky, 1955)
Altenia perspersella (Wocke, 1862)
Altenia scriptella (Hubner, 1796)
Altenia wagneriella (Rebel, 1926)

References

 
Litini
Moth genera